Hill End may refer to:

Australia
Hill End, New South Wales
Hill End, Queensland, a suburb of Brisbane
Hill End, Victoria

United Kingdom
Hill End, County Durham, England
Hill End, Fife, a location in the United Kingdom
Hill End, Gloucestershire, a location in the United Kingdom
Hill End, Hertfordshire, a location in the United Kingdom
Hill End, North Yorkshire, a location in the United Kingdom
Hill End, Somerset, a location in the United Kingdom
Hill End, Worcestershire, a location in the United Kingdom
Hill End railway station, on the defunct Hatfield and St Albans Railway

See also
Hillend (disambiguation)
Hills End, a classic in Australian children's literature